The Starfighters is a 1964 American Cold War film. It was written and directed by Will Zens and stars Bob Dornan, Richard Jordahl and Richard Masters. In an unusual twist based on the storyline of a pilot and his congressman father, pilot and actor Dornan would seek and win election as a U.S. congressman in California.

The Starfighters did not go into wide release. It was the subject of episode #612 of Comedy Central's Mystery Science Theater 3000 and was labeled one of their "10 most unwatchable films" viewed by Paste magazine.

Plot
Lieutenant John "Junior" Witkowski (Bob Dornan) and his buddy, Lieutenant York (Steve Early), arrive at George Air Force Base, Tactical Air Command, in Southern California to train to fly the Lockheed F-104 Starfighter, with special emphasis on the complicated mid-air refueling maneuver.

Witkowski's congressman father (Carl Rogers), a famed World War II bomber pilot, frequently calls him, concerned about the safety of fighter aircraft. The congressman wants his son to be transferred to a Convair B-58 Hustler or Boeing B-52 Stratofortress bomber squadron in the Strategic Air Command. Witkowski also finds romance with Mary Davidson (Shirley Olmstead), an Iowa girl.

During training, Major Stevens (Richard Jordahl) sends Witkowski, York and Lieutenant Lyons (Robert Winston) on a cross-country mission. The three trainees are forced to separate as they encounter a storm. Lyons' aircraft goes down in the mountains, while Witkowski is feared lost. Later, they learn that Lyons parachuted safely, and Witkowski has landed safely at an alternate base. Witkowski, who has impressed senior officers and won his father's admiration, is among those selected to be transferred to a unit in Europe and bids a temporary good-bye to Mary.

Cast

 Robert Dornan as Lieutenant John Witkowski Jr.
 Richard Jordahl as Major "Madge" Stevens
 Shirley Olmstead as Mary Davidson
 Richard Masters as Colonel Hunt
 Steve Early as Lieutenant York
 Robert Winston as Lieutenant Lyons
 Carl Rogers as Congressman John Witkowski
 Ralph Thomas as Captain O'Brien
 Joan Lougee as Betty Lyon

Production
The catchline: "The blazing adventure of the men and planes who rocket to the very edge of space" and the poster showing a character with a full-face visor helmet similar to an astronaut belies the film's very evident "infomercial" look. The majority of The Starfighters deals with the training of F-104 pilots during the period when the aircraft was being introduced in the United States Air Force, and consists predominantly of stock footage. The footage was of the F-104s of the 831st Air Division (479th Tactical Fighter Wing), stationed at George AFB from October 1958.

The aircraft featured in The Starfighters included F-104A and C variants, the Boeing KC-135 Stratotanker, the Lockheed T-33 and the Kaman H-43B Huskie.

Reception and legacy
The Starfighters was not given wide release and was soon relegated to drive-in theaters and second run showings. Although it was not critically reviewed, audience reaction since has continually placed it in the category of one of the "worst films" ever.

Appearance on MST3K
The Starfighters was featured in episode #612 of Mystery Science Theater 3000. The cast and crew (and later fans) of Mystery Science Theater 3000 were the film's most prominent critics. Tom Servo summed it up thus: "So basically, according to themselves, the Air Force is a bunch of leather-faced, not-so-bright, heavy drinking, dull-witted speed freaks who poop in their pants and can't make it with women, right?" The Mystery Science Theater 3000 Amazing Colossal Episode Guide complained "nothing happens in it." It provided several running gags that were repeated throughout the series: humming the jazzy music whenever an aircraft is seen flying, mentions of the "poopie suit" (an Air Force survival suit designed to help contain body heat in the event of a bailout over water), and the use of the word "refueling" as a synonym for any long, dull scene.

Home media
The MST3K version of the film is included in the Mystery Science Theater 3000 Collection Volume 12 DVD set from Rhino Entertainment and later Shout Factory.

References

Notes

Bibliography

 Beaulieu, Trace, Paul Chaplin et al. The Mystery Science Theater 3000 Amazing Colossal Episode Guide. New York: Bantam, 1996. .

External links
 
 
AllMovie

1964 films
1964 drama films
American drama films
Cold War aviation films
Cold War films
American anti-communist propaganda films
American independent films
Films about the United States Air Force
Films directed by Will Zens
1960s rediscovered films
Rediscovered American films
1960s English-language films
1960s American films